Inga Cadranel (born April 30, 1978) is a Canadian film and television actress. She is best known for playing the roles of Brooke Fairburn on The Eleventh Hour, Liz Santerra on Jeff Ltd., Francesca on Rent-a-Goalie, Aife on Lost Girl, Detective Angela "Angie" Deangelis on Orphan Black, and Lorraine "Harmony" Miller on General Hospital.

Early life
Cadranel was born in Toronto, Ontario, Canada. Her mother is Maja Ardal and her father is Jeff Braunstein.

Career
Cadranel has starred in a number of Canadian television shows since the 2000s. She was a regular cast member of The Eleventh Hour, Jeff Ltd., Rent-a-Goalie, and The Bridge. She also had recurring roles in Lost Girl, Orphan Black and The Strain. In April 2019, Cadranel landed the recurring role of Harmony Miller on General Hospital. She was involved in a major storyline which resulted in the death of her character on May 4, 2022.

Personal life
Cadranel is married to actor Gabriel Hogan; they have one son, Ryder.

Filmography

Film

Television

References

External links 
 

1978 births
Living people
21st-century Canadian actresses
Actresses from Toronto
Canadian television actresses
Canadian people of Icelandic descent
Canadian people of Armenian descent
Canadian Comedy Award winners